The Campaspe River is a  long tributary of Cape River in Queensland, Australia near Charters Towers.  It rises at Homestead and flows southeasterly through Pentland to Campaspe where it joins the Cape River.

Tributaries includes Homestead Creek, Balfe Creek and Policeman Creek.  There are no major settlements along its course.  The river is crossed by the Flinders Highway. Its catchment area remains undeveloped.

See also

 List of rivers of Queensland

References

Rivers of Queensland
Charters Towers
North Queensland